The 2011 New South Wales Swifts season saw New South Wales Swifts compete in the 2011 ANZ Championship. During the regular season, Swifts finished in third place. They qualified for the playoffs but subsequently lost to Northern Mystics in the minor semi-final, finishing the season in 4th place.  After fifteen seasons as Sydney Swifts/New South Wales Swifts head coach, this was the last season Julie Fitzgerald served as head coach. Following a controversial "internal review", Fitzgerald was replaced as head coach by Lisa Beehag. The review was conducted during the 2011 season. Catherine Cox and Liz Ellis publicly criticized Netball New South Wales for distracting players with the review and even alleged that it was responsible for Swifts losing the 2011 minor semi-final.

Players

Player movements

Roster

Milestones
 Carla Dziwoki, made her Swifts debut in the fourth quarter of the Round 1 match against Adelaide Thunderbirds, scoring 11 goals from 11 attempts.
 Kimberlee Green celebrated her 100th senior league game in Round 2 against Queensland Firebirds.
 Mo'onia Gerrard celebrated her 150th senior league game in Round 5 against Canterbury Tactix.

Pre-season 
NSW Swifts Tournament
On 22–23 January,  hosted and won a tournament at Sydney Olympic Park Sports Centre.

Five Quarter series
On 29–30 January, Northern Mystics and New South Wales Swifts played two five-quarter matches.

Regular season

Fixtures and results
Round 1

Round 2

Round 3

Round 4

Round 5

Round 6

Round 7

Round 8
New South Wales Swifts received a bye.
Round 9

Round 10 

Round 11

Round 12

Standings

Finals

Minor semifinal

Statistics

Award winners

Swifts awards

References

New South Wales Swifts seasons
New South Wales Swifts